Ferdinand Veike (13 November 1924, Saueaugu – 14 August 2015) was an Estonian puppeteer actor.

In 1952 he founded  Estonian State Puppet Theater (now, the NUKU Theatre) and was a principal actor with the theatre.

In 2001 he was awarded with Order of the White Star, V class.

References

1924 births
2015 deaths
Estonian male stage actors
Recipients of the Order of the White Star, 5th Class
People from Türi Parish
Burials at Pärnamäe Cemetery